The 1998 NCAA Division III football season, part of the college football season organized by the NCAA at the Division III level in the United States, began in August 1998, and concluded with the NCAA Division III Football Championship, also known as the Stagg Bowl, in December 1998 at Salem Football Stadium in Salem, Virginia. The Mount Union Purple Raiders won their fourth, and third consecutive, Division III championship by defeating the Rowan Profs, 44−24.

The Gagliardi Trophy, given to the most outstanding player in Division III football, was awarded to Scott Hvistendahl, wide receiver and punter from Augsburg.

Conference standings

Conference champions

Postseason
The 1998 NCAA Division III Football Championship playoffs were the 26th annual single-elimination tournament to determine the national champion of men's NCAA Division III college football. The championship Stagg Bowl game was held at Salem Football Stadium in Salem, Virginia for the second time. As of 2014, Salem has remained the yearly host of the Stagg Bowl. This was the final bracket to feature sixteen teams before expanding to 28 teams in 1999.

Playoff bracket

Final NCAA Regional Poll

East Region 

Others receiving votes (listed alphabetically): Hartwick, Hobart, Rensselaer Polytechnic, and Salve Regina.

South Region 

Others receiving votes:  McMurry, Pomona-Pitzer, Westminster, and Widener.

North Region 

Others receiving votes:  Allegheny, Hanover, John Carroll, and MacMurray.

West Region 

Others receiving votes:  Grinnell, Linfield, Wartburg, and Wisconsin-Whitewater.

*This was the final time the NCAA conducted a regional poll for Division III, starting with the 1999 season, American Football Coaches Association conducted a top 25 coaches poll.

Awards
Gagliardi Trophy:  Scott Hvistendahl, Augsburg

AFCA Coach of the Year: Larry Kehres, Mount Union

AFCA Regional Coach of the Year: Region 1: Mike DeLong, Springfield  Region 2: Frank Girardi, Lycoming Region 3: Steve Mohr, Trinity(TX) Region 4: Joe Fincham, Wittenberg Region 5: Rich Kacmarynski, Central(IA)

See also
1998 NCAA Division I-A football season
1998 NCAA Division I-AA football season
1998 NCAA Division II football season

References